The 2012 World Cup of Pool is the seventh edition of the said tournament. For the fourth straight year, the event is once again being held in the Philippines, this time at the Robinsons Place Manila in Manila, from September 4 to 9, 2012. The Finnish team of Mika Immonen and Petri Makkonen defeated the Polish team of Karol Skowerski and Wojciech Szewcyk in the final, 10–8.

Tournament Rules
Winners' break.
Teammates take shots alternately.
Race to eight racks for matches prior to the quarterfinals.
Race to nine racks for matches from the quarterfinals to the semifinals.
Race to ten racks for the Final.
Eighty-second shot clock for the shot immediately after the break, forty seconds for other shots.
In order for a break to be legal, at least two balls must pass over the head string.

Prize fund
Winners (per pair): $60,000
Runners-up (per pair): $30,000
Semi-finalists (per pair): $16,000
Quarter-finalists (per pair): $10,000
Round 2 losers (per pair): $5,000
Round 1 losers (per pair): $3,000

Participating nations

Seeded teams:
 (Ralf Souquet and Thorsten Hohmann)
 A (Lee Van Corteza and Dennis Orcollo)
 (Darren Appleton and Chris Melling)
 (Liu Haitao and Li Hewen)
 (Shane Van Boening and Rodney Morris)
 (Han En Hsu and Hsin Ting Chen)
 (Nick van den Berg and Huidji See)
 B (Francisco Bustamante and Efren Reyes)
 (Alex Pagulayan and John Morra)
 (Karol Skowerski and Wojciech Szewcyk)
 (Naoyuki Oi and Satoshi Kawabata)
 (Albin Ouschan and Mario He)
 (David Alcaide and Francisco Diaz Pizarro)
 (Nitiwat Kanjanasri and Kobkit Palajin)
 (Bruno Muratore and Fabio Petroni)
 (Mika Immonen and Petri Makkonen)

Unseeded teams:
 (Dave Reljic and Ian Barber)
 (Serge Das and Cliff Castelein)
 (Karlo Dalmatin and Philipp Stojanovic)
 (Lee Chenman and Kenny Kwok)
 (Miko Balazs and Gabor Solymosi)
 (Raj Hundal and Amar Kang)
 (Roy Apancho and Muhammad Bewi Simanjuntak)
 (Ryu Seung Woo and Lee Wan Su)
 (Abdullah Al Yousef and Omar Al Shaheen)
 (Patrick Ooi Fook Yuen and Ibrahim Bin Amir)
 (Konstantin Stepanov and Vitaly Pavlukhin)
 (Andrea Klasovic and Zoran Svilar)
 (Aloysius Yapp and Chan Keng Kwang)
 (Marcus Chamat and Andreas Gerwen)
 (Dimitri Jungo and Ronni Regli)
 (Nguyen Anh Tuan and Do The Kien)

Tournament bracket

References

External link

2012
2012 in cue sports
2012 in Philippine sport
International sports competitions hosted by the Philippines
Sports in Manila
September 2012 sports events in the Philippines